The 1961–62 Illinois Fighting Illini men's basketball team represented the University of Illinois.

Regular season
The 1961-62 Fighting Illini basketball team bounced back from a miserable season the year prior.  Head coach Harry Combes non-conference season was nearly perfect with an 8-1 record.  The only blemish for the University of Illinois was a home loss to Cornell. The most unusual thing about this season was the fact that the Illini played three neutral court games in Chicago.  This would also be the final full season that the Fighting Illini would play their home games at Huff Hall.

The 1961-62 team utilized several returning lettermen including the leading scorer and team "MVP" Dave Downey. It also saw the return of team captain Jerry Colangelo, juniors Bill Burwell, Bill Small, Bob Starnes as well as senior Doug Mills. The Illini also added sophomore John Love to their lineup. The Illini finished the season with a conference record of 7 wins and 7 losses, finishing in a 4th place tie in the Big Ten. They would finish with an overall record of 15 wins and 8 losses.  The starting lineup included Bill Burwell at the center position, Bill Small and Jerry Colangelo at guard and Dave Downey and Bob Starnes at the forward slots.

Roster

Source

Schedule
												
Source																
												

|-
!colspan=12 style="background:#DF4E38; color:white;"| Non-Conference regular season
|- align="center" bgcolor=""
								

|-
!colspan=9 style="background:#DF4E38; color:#FFFFFF;"|Big Ten regular season

|-

Player stats

Awards and honors
Dave Downey
Converse Honorable Mention All-American
Team Most Valuable Player 
Bill Burwell
Converse Honorable Mention All-American

Team players drafted into the NBA

Rankings

References

Illinois Fighting Illini
Illinois Fighting Illini men's basketball seasons
1961 in sports in Illinois
1962 in sports in Illinois